Haverhill High School (HHS) is a public high school in Haverhill, Massachusetts, United States. It is part of the Haverhill Public Schools district and is open enrollment.

History 
At least three buildings have served as Haverhill High School.  A now-demolished building designed by George M. Harding opened in 1874.   Another building designed by C. Willis Damon opened in 1909.  That building is currently Haverhill's city hall.

Haverhill High School opened on Monument Street in 1963, with the first class to graduate being the class of 1964.

Athletics 
Haverhill High School competes in the Merrimack Valley Conference and is a member of the Massachusetts Interscholastic Athletic Association (MIAA).

Notable alumni 
 Bob Montana, comic strip artist — creator of Archie Comics which its high school, known as Riverdale High School, is based on this school when it was in its previous location
 Rob Zombie, musician and filmmaker, co-founder of the heavy metal band White Zombie.
 Tom Bergeron
 Carlos Peña
 Seth Romatelli

References

External links 

 

Merrimack Valley Conference
Schools in Haverhill, Massachusetts
Public high schools in Massachusetts